Petilia Policastro is a comune and town  in the province of Crotone, in Calabria, Italy.

History
Petilia Policastro is an ancient village, of presumed Byzantine origin, surrounded in the past by defensive walls. In its territory, along the Tacina and Soleo rivers, remains of settlements of Bruttian origin have been found, dating back to the 4th and 2nd centuries BC, and Roman vestiges. Along the Cropa river there are some caves of karstic origin that have been used in the past by shepherds during transhumance.

Monastic remains dating back to the Byzantine period have been found in some caves near the town, including a Byzantine cross carved into the wall. Below the town there are very extensive karstic caves that reach a depth of 100 meters. They are surrounded by underground lakes and rivers and clay pots dating back to Byzantine times were found in them.

The town today maintains the old, poorly maintained center of Byzantine origin. There are remains of later centuries, such as the palaces of the 17th and 18th centuries, since the Spanish monarchs in the 17th century sent the noble family of the Portiglia to have complete control of the surrounding territory. Among the ancient palaces, those of the Portiglia, the Aquila family (17th century), and those of the Filomarino and Ferrari families from the 18th century stand out. Also the churches are very old: Santa Maria Maggiore was built in the 15th century, San Nicola Pontefice and the Annunziata in the 17th century.

Recent archaeological investigations have allowed the discovery of a large major complex dating back to the Old and Middle Bronze Age (early 2nd millennium BC). This complex is framed in the context of the Capo Piccolo facies, which has close cultural and economic ties with the Capo Graziano, Sicilian Rodì and Salentian Apulian facies. The two bronze axes, with raised edges, which were found in the area in 1987 and are currently on display at the National Archaeological Museum in Crotone, date back to the same facies. One of the two axes, finely decorated with geometric drawings made with a burin, has been declared unique in Europe. It is assumed that the two axes, along with a dagger (now missing), were part of the funerary decoration of a high-ranking person.

Recently, new archaeological excavations in the Foresta locality for the construction of a new school have revealed the remains of a small rural building from the end of the Hellenistic period (3rd century BC).

In the historic center, in front of the current façade of the Church of San Nicola Pontefice, a cemetery with rock-cut tombs, some with multiple burials, dating back to the 17th century, was revealed. Other important remains, including ceramics and coins, have been found in the same excavation. According to Greek mythology, the city of Petelia was founded by Philoctetes, the archer famous for having killed Paris in the Trojan War.

On the mountains near the town, there are the convent and the church of the Santa Spina. The church, in Baroque style, dates back to 1600 and houses a thorn from the crown of Jesus Christ, donated in 1498 by Joan of Valois, Queen of France, (wife of Louis XII), to her personal confessor, Father Dionisio Sacco, bishop of Reims. The latter decided to take it to his monastery of origin, the Franciscan monastery of Petilia Policastro.

The town was home to Pope Anterus during the 3rd century.

Economy

The town relies on the production of olive oil, wine, cereals, citruses, the processing of timber from the local La Sila mountains, and the breeding of cattle.

References

Petilia Policastro